"It Turns Me Inside Out" is a song written by Jan Crutchfield, and originally recorded by Conway Twitty on his 1981 album Southern Comfort. American country music artist Lee Greenwood released the song as his debut single in September 1981 and the first from his album Inside Out.  The song reached No. 17 on the Billboard Hot Country Singles & Tracks chart.

Chart performance

References

1981 songs
1981 debut singles
Conway Twitty songs
Lee Greenwood songs
MCA Records singles
Song recordings produced by Jerry Crutchfield
Songs written by Jan Crutchfield